Destined 2 Win is the second studio album by American rapper Lil Tjay. It was released on April 2, 2021, through Columbia Records. This serves as the follow-up to his 2019 debut album "True 2 Myself". The production on the album was handled by multiple producers including Smash David, CashMoneyAP, 808Melo, Cubeatz and OG Parker among others. The album also features guest appearances from 6lack, Polo G, Fivio Foreign, Saweetie, Tyga, Toosii, Offset, and Moneybagg Yo.

Destined 2 Win was supported by six singles: "Losses", "Move On", "None of Your Love", "Calling My Phone", "Headshot" and "Born 2 Be Great". The album received generally positive reviews from music critics and was a commercial success. It debuted at number five on the US Billboard 200 chart, earning 62,000 album-equivalent units, in its first week. On January 12, 2023, the album was certified platinum.

Background
Merritt began teasing his second studio album in 2018. The album's title describes the reflections on his highlights and accomplishments.

Recording and Composition
Merritt began recording the album in May 2020 in Los Angeles. The album was eventually wrapped up in early 2021. Destined 2 Win is a hip hop album, incorporating elements of R&B, trap, emo rap and drill.

Promotion

Album documentary
Prior to the album's release, Merritt premiered the first part of the album's documentary that was directed by Sam Balaban on his YouTube channel. The documentary gives a behind-the-scenes look at the album's creation.

Music videos 
The music video for "Run It Up" featuring Offset and Moneybagg Yo was released on April 3, 2021.

The music video for "Oh Well" was released on April 4, 2021.

The music video for "Love Hurts" featuring Toosii was released on April 7, 2021.

Live performances
Lil Tjay and 6lack performed their song "Calling My Phone" on The Tonight Show Starring Jimmy Fallon on April 5, 2021.

Singles
The album's lead single "Losses" was released on October 30, 2020. It was accompanied by a music video on the same day.

The second single "Move On" was released on November 20, 2020. The song was announced on Tjay's Twitter, 3 days prior to the single's release revealing the song's covert art, title, and release date. It was accompanied by a music video directed by David Karp and Courtney Loo, the following day.

The third single "None of Your Love" was released on December 4, 2020. The song contains interpolates from Justin Bieber, and Ludacris' 2010 song "Baby". It was previously released on Merritt's YouTube channel but due to the sample, Bieber requested to remove the song and Merritt was unable to clear the sample. However, on December 1, 2020, Bieber eventually allowed Merritt to release the song to streaming services.

The fourth single "Calling My Phone" was released on February 12, 2021, featuring American singer 6lack and was accompanied by a music video that premiered on the same day. The song was previously teased on Merritt's social media. A teaser for the song was released on February 5 revealing its title and release date and that an unknown feature will appear on the song. Speculations on the feature for the song began to spread and was eventually confirmed on February 8 on a Twitter post that the feature would be 6lack.

The fifth single "Headshot" was released on March 19, 2021, with frequent collaborator Polo G, and American rapper Fivio Foreign. The song was announced via an Instagram live stream on March 15, 4 days before its initial release. It was accompanied by a music video that was released on March 23. In an interview with Zane Lowe and Apple Music of how the song came together, Merritt said the collaborators meshed immediately. He further elaborated saying 

The sixth and final single "Born 2 Be Great" was released on March 31, 2021. The song reminisces Merritt's troubled childhood in which he and his friends went through trouble to get where he is today.

Critical reception

Robin Murray of Clash Music praises Lil Tjay progression, calling the album a "A deft step outside of hood braggadocio". Murray also said the album truly thrives when Lil Tjay leaves his feelings and his creativity exposed. Overall, Murray gave the album a rating of 7 out of 10. Rose Lilah of HotNewHipHop also praised Tjay's progression with this album, stating that "While Destined 2 Win may keep certain themes intact from Tjay’s debut album, True 2 Myself, and his early success in general, the growth on this album is still evident, and it’s part of what makes Tjay such an exciting artist to follow." Lilah also said that "As a fan, we are able to clearly witness an evolution in real time." Lilah also spoke highly about the progression of Tjay's sophomore effort saying that "It also leaves the listener wanting more: whether that be through a quick replay or through the next song, it reels you in to Tjay’s personal journey, from juvenile detention to worldwide fame." Overall, Lilah believes Lil Tjay is manifesting his destiny, stating that "On Destined 2 Win, the young artist makes it known that this is a role he not only takes seriously, but one he plans to succeed in, no matter what."

Commercial performance
Destined 2 Win debuted at number five on the US Billboard 200 chart, earning 62,000 album-equivalent units, (including 3,000 copies in pure album sales) in its first week. This became Lil Tjay's second US top ten debut on the chart, matching True 2 Myself which also peaked at number five. The album also accumulated a total of 86.14 million on-demand streams from the album’s songs. In its second week, the album dropped to number eight on the chart, earning an additional 38,000 units. On July 12, 2021, the album was certified gold by the Recording Industry Association of America (RIAA) for combined sales and album-equivalent units of over 500,000 units in the United States. As of September 2021, the album has earned 570,000 album-equivalent units in the United States. On January 12, 2023, the album was certified platinum.

Track listing

Sample credits
 "Calling My Phone" contains samples from "How I Been", performed by YoungBoy Never Broke Again
 "None of Your Love" contains samples from "Baby", performed by Justin Bieber featuring Ludacris
 "Born 2 Be Great" contains samples from "Work", performed by Rihanna featuring Drake

Personnel
Credits adapted from Tidal.

 Bordeaux – mixing engineer , mastering engineer , recording engineer 
 Eric Lagg – mastering engineer 
 Todd Hurtt – recording engineer 
 Tweek Tune – recording engineer 
 JT Gagarin – recording engineer  
 Barrington Hall – recording engineer 
 Mitch Kenny – recording engineer 
 Drü Oliver – recording engineer 
 Randy Urbanski – recording engineer  
 Christian "CQ" Quinonez – recording engineer 
 David Cabrera – recording engineer 
 Jadon John – recording engineer 
 Brandyn Marko – recording engineer 
 Nick Cavalieri – recording engineer

Charts

Weekly charts

Year-end charts

Certifications

References

2021 albums
Lil Tjay albums
Albums produced by Cubeatz
Albums produced by OG Parker
Columbia Records albums